Phigalia plumogeraria, the walnut spanworm moth, is a species of geometrid moth in the family Geometridae.

The MONA or Hodges number for Phigalia plumogeraria is 6661.

References

Further reading

External links

 

Bistonini
Articles created by Qbugbot
Moths described in 1888